The Beijing Ancient Observatory is a pretelescopic observatory located in Beijing, China. The observatory was built in 1442 during the Ming dynasty, and expanded during the Qing. It received major reorganization and many new, more accurate instruments from Europeans (Jesuits) in 1644.
 
As one of the oldest observatories in the world, the Beijing Ancient Observatory grounds cover an area of 10,000 square meters. The observatory itself is located on a 40 by 40 meter wide platform on the top of a 15 meter tall brick tower, an extant portion of the old Ming dynasty era city wall that once encircled Beijing. Several of the bronze astronomical instruments are on the platform, and other armillary spheres, sundials, and other instruments are located nearby at ground level. It is operated as a museum in affiliation with the Beijing Planetarium.

History

It was said that in 1227, the Jin dynasty transferred the ancient astronomical instruments from Kaifeng to the first observatory in Beijing. In 1279, the succeeding Mongols under Kublai Khan built a new observatory just north of the current observatory. Kublai Khan made his chief adviser of hydraulics, mathematics and astronomy, Guo Shoujing, director of the observatory in 1283 after the death of Guo's friend and predecessor Zhang Wenqian. After the Mongols, Zhu Yuanzhang, the founding Ming Emperor, transferred the instruments from Beijing to Nanjing. When the Yongle Emperor came to power, he had craftsmen make copies of the instruments in Nanjing and sent them to the Beijing observatory.

The current observatory was completed in 1442. It assisted the Ming and Qing astronomers in their observation reports for the Emperor. As he was considered the "Son of Heaven", the movements of the heavenly bodies were an important affair. Another function was to assist sea navigation, with Muslim scholars recruited for their expertise in the area. In the mid-17th century, after winning an astronomy contest, the Jesuit Ferdinand Verbiest was awarded complete charge of the astronomy observatory by the emperor. In 1673, he supervised the rebuilding of some of the instruments. He and other Jesuits helped to further develop the observations of the stars and the planets.

During the later stages of the Qing dynasty, members of the Eight-Nation Alliance looted some of the instruments. However, as World War I drew to a close, the instruments were returned to China by the French and German governments. An early seismograph of Zhang Heng's design used to be housed at the observatory. Some of the instruments from the Ming era are now at Purple Mountain Observatory in Nanjing.

Access and nearby attractions
The Beijing Ancient Observatory is located just south of Jianguomen in Dongcheng District and can be accessed by Lines 1 and 2 of the Beijing Subway to Jianguomen station (Exit C) and bus routes 25, 39, 43, 44, 52, 122, 434, 637, 638, 750 and 特2 to Jianguomen South (建国门桥南).  The Beijing railway station and the Ming City Wall Relics Park are a short walk to the south.

See also
 Chinese astronomy
 History of Beijing
Ferdinand Augustin Hallerstein, creator of some of the instruments
Ignaz Kögler, creator of some of the instruments
Ferdinand Verbiest, creator of some of the instruments
 List of astronomical observatories
 List of Jesuit sites

References

External links

 Official site 
 Google Maps satellite image
 Beijing Ancient Observatory travel guide
 Tour of Beijing Ancient Observatory in virtual reality
 Photograph archives (1889) from the Paris Observatory

Buildings and structures completed in 1442
Ming dynasty architecture
Qing dynasty architecture
Tourist attractions in Beijing
Museums in Beijing
Astronomical observatories in China
Science museums in China
Major National Historical and Cultural Sites in Beijing